Fortitudo-Pro Roma Società di Ginnastica e Scherma is a sports society founded in 1908 as Fortitudo in Rome, in Rione Borgo, and with seat in Piazza Adriana. Particularly famous was its football section, an Italian football club also founded in 1908. The club is most noted for competing in the early Italian Football Championship competitions, before in 1927 becoming one of three Rome based clubs merging to form AS Roma.

The society and the team were founded by some friars from the Brothers of Our Lady of Mercy order, who since 1859 ran the Pontificia Scuola Pio IX, one of the most ancient schools in Rome. Fortitudo (in English Courage or Fortitude) is in fact the name of one of the four cardinal Virtues of the Catholic tradition, and is a popular name in Italy for sport teams founded by religious organizations.

In 1926 Fortitudo merged with Pro Roma to form Fortitudo–Pro Roma, just one year before merging into AS Roma.

Honours
Italian Football Championship:
Southern Champions: 1921–22

References

A.S. Roma
Football clubs in Rome
Defunct football clubs in Lazio
Defunct football clubs in Italy
Association football clubs established in 1908
Association football clubs disestablished in 1927
Italian football First Division clubs
1908 establishments in Italy
1927 disestablishments in Italy
Rome R. XIV Borgo